Gigolette may refer to:
 Gigolette (1935 film), an American romance film
 Gigolette (1937 film), a French drama film

See also
 Gigolete, a 1924 Brazilian silent drama film
 Gigolettes, a 1932 American Pre-Code comedy film